Karen Atkinson is a camogie player, winner of All-Ireland Senior Camogie Championship medals in 2007 2010 2011 and as All Ireland winning captain in 2012. She was an All-Star nominee in 2010.

Other awards
National Camogie League medals in 2009, 2010 and 2011; National League Division two 2009; Leinster Championship 2011 2010 2009; All Star nominee 2010 Ashbourne Cup 2009; three All-Ireland Féile na nGael 1998, 1999, 2000; Leinster Under-14 2000 (captain); Leinster Under-16 2002; Leinster and Winner of All-Ireland Senior medals at Colleges level with Coláiste Bríde 2003, 2004; Leinster Junior 2003, 2004; Leinster Senior 2004, 2007; Club Senior 2003, 2004, 2005, 2006, 2007, 2009; Leinster Club Senior 2009; All-Ireland club sevens 2006. Karen's sister, Colleen, was also on the Wexford panel and captained the winning Intermediate team in 2011.

References

External links
 Camogie.ie Official Camogie Association Website
 Wexford Wexford camogie site

1986 births
Living people
Wexford camogie players
Waterford IT camogie players